The modern constellation Carina lies across one of the quadrants symbolized by the Vermillion Bird of the South (南方朱雀, Nán Fāng Zhū Què) and The Southern Asterisms (近南極星區, Jìnnánjíxīngōu), that divide the sky in traditional Chinese uranography.

According to the quadrant, possibly constellation Carina in Chinese sky is almost not seen, except Canopus (Alpha Carinae), and Canopus is "south pole" in Chinese sky, and Miaplacidus (Beta Carinae), Aspidiske (Iota Carinae) and Avior (Epsilon Carinae) are bright stars in this constellation that are possibly never seen in the Chinese sky.

The name of the western constellation in modern Chinese is 船底座 (chuán dǐ zuò), meaning "the bottom of boat constellation".

Stars
The map of Chinese constellation in constellation Carina area consists of :

See also
Traditional Chinese star names
Chinese constellations
List of brightest stars

References

External links
Carina – Chinese associations
 香港太空館研究資源
 中國星區、星官及星名英譯表
 天象文學
 台灣自然科學博物館天文教育資訊網
 中國古天文
 中國古代的星象系統

Astronomy in China
Carina (constellation)